Ectoedemia algeriensis is a moth of the family Nepticulidae. It is found in Algeria, the Atlas mountains in Morocco and in southern France.

The wingspan is 5-5.6 mm. Adults are on wing in June. There is probably one generation per year.

The larvae feed on Quercus coccifera, Quercus ilex, Quercus ilex rotundifolia and Quercus suber. They mine the leaves of their host plant. The mine consists of a contorted corridor, often following a vein for some distance. The frass is black and leaves narrow clear margins.

External links
Fauna Europaea
bladmineerders.nl
A Taxonomic Revision Of The Western Palaearctic Species Of The Subgenera Zimmermannia Hering And Ectoedemia Busck s.str. (Lepidoptera, Nepticulidae), With Notes On Their Phylogeny

Nepticulidae
Moths of Europe
Moths of Africa
Moths described in 1985